Sidi's generalized secant method is a root-finding algorithm, that is, a numerical method for solving equations of the form  . The method was published
by Avram Sidi.

The method is a generalization of the secant method. The method can converge much faster though, with an order which approaches 2 provided that  satisfies the regularity conditions described below.

Algorithm 

Starting with k + 1 initial approximations , the approximation  is calculated in the first iteration, the approximation  is calculated in the second iteration, etc. Hence the nth iteration takes as input the approximations  and the values .

The number k must be 1 or larger: k = 1, 2, 3, ....  It remains fixed during the execution of the algorithm. In order to obtain the starting approximations  one could carry out a few initializing iterations with a lower value of k.

The approximation  is calculated as follows in the nth iteration. A polynomial of interpolation  of degree k is fitted to the k + 1 points .

Having calculated  one calculates  and the algorithm can continue with the (n + 1)th iteration.

The iterative cycle is stopped if an appropriate stop-criterion is met. Typically the criterion is that the last calculated approximation is close enough to the sought-after root .

To execute the algorithm effectively, Sidi's method calculates the interpolating polynomial  in its Newton form.

Convergence 

Sidi furthermore showed that

The order of convergence  is the only positive root of the polynomial

We have e.g.  ≈ 1.6180,  ≈ 1.8393 and  ≈ 1.9276. The order approaches 2 from below if k becomes large:

Related algorithms 
Sidi's method reduces to the secant method if we take k = 1.

This is the Newton–Raphson method. It does not require an interpolating polynomial but instead one has to evaluate the derivative  in each iteration. Depending on the nature of  this may not be possible or practical.

Once the interpolating polynomial  has been calculated, one can also calculate the next approximation  as a solution of  instead of using. For k = 1 these two methods are identical: it is the secant method. For k = 2 this method is known as Muller's method. For k = 3 this approach involves finding the roots of a cubic function, which is unattractively complicated. This problem becomes worse for even larger values of k. An additional complication is that the equation  will in general have multiple solutions and a prescription has to be given which of these solutions is the next approximation . Muller does this for the case k = 2 but no such prescriptions appear to exist for k > 2.

References 

Root-finding algorithms